Kononov (masculine), Kononova (feminine) is a Russian patronymic surname derived from the given name Konon. Notable people with the surname include:

Aleksandr Kononov, lay name of bishop 
Elena Kononova
Igor Kononov
Lyubov Kononova
Mikhail Kononov
Mykyta Kononov
Nikolay Kononov
Oleg Kononov
Oleksandra Kononova
Vassili Kononov
Vitaliy Kononov
Vladimir Kononov (disambiguation) (several persons)
Vyacheslav Kononov

See also

Russian-language surnames
Patronymic surnames